The Prix de Rome or Grand Prix de Rome was a French scholarship for arts students, initially for painters and sculptors, that was established in 1663 during the reign of Louis XIV of France. Winners were awarded a bursary that allowed them to stay in Rome for three to five years at the expense of the state. The prize was extended to architecture in 1720, music in 1803 and engraving in 1804. The prestigious award was abolished in 1968 by André Malraux, then Minister of Culture, following the May 68 riots that called for cultural change.

History
The Prix de Rome was initially created for painters and sculptors in 1663 in France, during the reign of Louis XIV. It was an annual bursary for promising artists having proved their talents by completing a very difficult elimination contest. To succeed, a student had to create a sketch on an assigned topic while isolated in a closed booth with no reference material to draw on. The prize, organised by the Académie Royale de Peinture et de Sculpture (Royal Academy of Painting and Sculpture), was open to their students. From 1666, the award winner could win a stay of three to five years at the Palazzo Mancini in Rome at the expense of the King of France. In 1720, the Académie Royale d’Architecture began a prize in architecture. Six painters, four sculptors, and two architects would be sent to the French Academy in Rome founded by Jean-Baptiste Colbert from 1666.

Expanded after 140 years into five categories, the contest started in 1663 as two categories: painting and sculpture. Architecture was added in 1720. In 1803, music was added, and after 1804 there was a prix for engraving as well. The primary winner took the "First Grand Prize" (called the agréé), and the "Second Prizes" were awarded to the runners-up.

In 1803, Napoleon Bonaparte moved the French Academy in Rome to the Villa Medici, with the intention of preserving an institution once threatened by the French Revolution. At first, the villa and its gardens were in a sad state, and they had to be renovated in order to house the winners of the Prix de Rome. In this way, he hoped to retain for young French artists the opportunity to see and copy the masterpieces of antiquity and the Renaissance.

Jacques-Louis David, having failed to win the prize three years in a row, considered suicide. Édouard Manet, Edgar Degas, Ernest Chausson, and Maurice Ravel attempted the Prix de Rome but did not gain recognition. Ravel tried a total of five times to win the prize, and the last failed attempt in 1905 was so controversial that it led to a complete reorganization of the administration at the Paris Conservatory.

During World War II (1939–45), the prize winners were accommodated in the Villa Paradiso in Nice.
The Prix de Rome was abolished in 1968 by André Malraux, who was Minister of Culture at the time. Since then, a number of contests have been created, and the academies, together with the Institut de France, were merged by the State and the Minister of Culture. Selected residents now have an opportunity for study during an 18-month (sometimes 2-year) stay at The Academy of France in Rome, which is accommodated in the Villa Medici.

The heyday of the Prix de Rome was during the late eighteenth and early nineteenth centuries. It was later imitated by the Prix Abd-el-Tif and the Villa Abd-el-Tif in Algiers, 1907–1961, and later Prix d'Indochine including a bursary to visit the École des Beaux-Arts de l'Indochine in Hanoi, 1920–1939, and bursary for residence at the Casa de Velázquez in Madrid, 1929–present.

Winners in the Architecture category
The Prix de Rome for Architecture was created in 1720.

18th century (architecture)

Notes

19th century (architecture)

Notes

20th century (architecture)

First Prize Winners in the Painting category

17th century (painting)

18th century (painting)

19th century (painting)

20th century (painting)

First Prize Winners in the Sculpture category

17th century (sculpture)

18th century (sculpture)

19th century (sculpture)

20th century (sculpture)

First Prize Winners in the Engraving category
The engraving prize was created in 1804.

19th century (engraving)

20th century (engraving)

First Prize Winners in the Musical Composition category
The required composition was originally a cantata for solo voice and orchestra; later one male and female voice were specified; and later still three voices. Titles of the pieces have generally been restricted to "cantata", "lyric scene" or "dramatic scene".

19th century (musical composition)

20th century (musical composition) 

 List of all the winners of the Prix de Rome for musical composition

Prix de Rome (Netherlands)

A Prix de Rome was also established in the Kingdom of Holland by Lodewijk Napoleon to award young artists and architects. During the years 1807–1810 prize winners were sent to Paris and onwards to Rome for study. In 1817, after the Netherlands had gained its independence, King Willem I restarted the prize; though it took until 1823 before the new "Royal Academies" of Amsterdam and Antwerp could organize the juries. Suspended in 1851 it was reinstated in 1870 by William III of the Netherlands. Since then the winners have been selected by the Rijksakademie in Amsterdam under the main headings of architecture and the visual arts.

Prix de Rome (Belgium)

The Belgian Prix de Rome (Dutch: Prijs van Rome) is an award for young artists, created in 1832, following the example of the original French Prix de Rome. The Royal Academy of Fine Arts Antwerp organised the prize until 1920, when the national government took over. The first prize is also sometimes called the Grand Prix de Rome. There were distinct categories for architecture, painting, sculpture and music.

See also
 Académie de France Rome
 American Academy in Rome
 American School of Classical Studies at Athens
 American Schools of Oriental Research
 British School at Rome
 Deutsches Archäologisches Institut Rom
 Rome Prize
 List of European art awards

References

External links
 The Prix de Rome Contests in Painting
 The Prix de Rome winners in Sculpture (in French)
 Prix de Rome winners in Music, 1803-1968
 Liste des pensionnaires de l'Académie de France à Rome, donnant les noms de tous les artistes récompensés dans les concours du Prix de Rome de 1663 à 1907

1663 establishments in France
Awards established in 1663
1968 disestablishments in France
Architecture awards
French art awards
Arts awards
Culture in Rome
Education in Rome
French awards